Johnny Halafihi (born 25 August 1933) was a former Tongan-born New Zealand professional light heavy/heavyweight boxer, active in the 1950s and 1960s.

Halafihi won the New Zealand Boxing Association light heavyweight title, drew with Mike Holt for the vacant British Commonwealth light heavyweight title, and was a challenger for the British Commonwealth light heavyweight title against Chic Calderwood. He died in the United Kingdom.

In December 2009 he was inducted into the Tonga National Sports Hall of Fame.

References

External links

Image - Johnny Halafihi
Image - Johnny Halafihi
Image - Johnny Halafihi

1933 births
Heavyweight boxers
Light-heavyweight boxers
New Zealand professional boxing champions
Tongan male boxers
New Zealand male boxers
Tongan emigrants to New Zealand